Tomás Calvo (1890 – death unknown) was a Cuban outfielder in the Negro leagues and the Cuban League in the 1910s and 1920s.

A native of Cuba, Calvo was the brother of major leaguer Jack Calvo. Older brother Tomás made his Negro leagues debut in 1915 with the Long Branch Cubans, and played with the club again in 1916. Between 1912 and 1923, he also played several seasons in the Cuban League with the Almendares and Habana clubs.

References

External links
 and Seamheads

1890 births
Date of birth missing
Year of death missing
Place of birth missing
Place of death missing
Almendares (baseball) players
Habana players
Long Branch Cubans players